The 2017 UCI Oceania Tour is the 13th season of the UCI Oceania Tour. The season began on 22 January 2017 with the New Zealand Cycle Classic and finished on 4 March 2017 with the Continental Championships.

The points leader, based on the cumulative results of previous races, wears the UCI Oceania Tour cycling jersey. Sean Lake from Australia is the defending 2016 UCI Oceania Tour champion.

Throughout the season, points are awarded to the top finishers of stages within stage races and the final general classification standings of each of the stages races and one-day events. The quality and complexity of a race also determines how many points are awarded to the top finishers, the higher the UCI rating of a race, the more points are awarded.
The UCI ratings from highest to lowest are as follows:
 Multi-day events: 2.HC, 2.1 and 2.2
 One-day events: 1.HC, 1.1 and 1.2

Events

External links
 

 
UCI Oceania Tour
UCI Oceania Tour
UCI Oceania Tour